Robert Gibbons (December 24, 1811 – August 19, 1898) was an Ontario political figure. He represented Huron South in the Legislative Assembly of Ontario as a Liberal member in 1867 and from 1871 to 1872.

He was born in Glasgow, Scotland in 1811 and came to Lanark County in Upper Canada with his family in 1820. They spent five years farming near Potsdam, New York and then Robert moved to Goderich in 1832. He farmed there, raised livestock, and worked as a butcher. Gibbons served in the local militia during the Upper Canada Rebellion. He was warden (head of a county council) for Huron County and served as mayor of Goderich in 1853 to 1855. He was elected to the Ontario legislature in 1867 but unseated on appeal in 1868 and reelected in 1871; he resigned his seat to become sheriff for Huron County in 1872. He died at Goderich in 1898.

References

External links
Member's parliamentary history for the Legislative Assembly of Ontario
 

1811 births
Ontario Liberal Party MPPs
Mayors of places in Ontario
Politicians from Glasgow
People from Lanark County
Scottish emigrants to pre-Confederation Ontario
1898 deaths
Immigrants to Upper Canada